Jong-il, also spelled Jong-yil, is a Korean masculine given name. Its meaning differs based on the hanja used to write each syllable of the name. There are 19 hanja with the reading "jong" and ten hanja with the reading "il" on the South Korean government's official list of hanja which may be registered for use in given names.

People with this name include:
Ra Jong-yil (born 1940), South Korean diplomat
Kim Jong-il (athlete) (born 1962), South Korean long jumper
Park Jong-il (born 1972), South Korean ski mountaineer
Choi Jong-il, South Korean businessman, CEO of Iconix Entertainment

See also
List of Korean given names

References

Korean masculine given names